The 1971 British League season was the 37th season of the top tier of speedway in the United Kingdom and the seventh season known as the British League.

Summary
Reading Racers moved up from Division 2 and Newcastle Diamonds dropped out. Belle Vue Aces retained their title to become the first team to win the title for the second time. The team included three time world champion Ivan Mauger, Swedish international Sören Sjösten, Tommy Roper, Eric Broadbelt, Chris Pusey and a 17 year old Peter Collins in his debut season.

Final table
M = Matches; W = Wins; D = Draws; L = Losses; Pts = Total Points

British League Knockout Cup
The 1971 Speedway Star British League Knockout Cup was the 33rd edition of the Knockout Cup for tier one teams. Hackney were the winners.

First round

Second round

Quarter-finals

Semi-finals

Final

First leg

Second leg

Hackney Hawks were declared Knockout Cup Champions, winning on aggregate 88-68.

Final leading averages

Riders & final averages
Belle Vue

 11.33
 9.11
 7.14
 7.01
 6.97
 6.36
 6.30
 5.27
 4.74
 4.50

Coventry

 9.95
 7.81
 7.66
 6.16
 5.91
 5.59
 5.07

Cradley Heath

 9.68
 7.73
 7.25
 6.00
 5.57
 4.66
 4.25
 3.60
 2.10
 1.54

Exeter

 8.92
 8.87
 6.42
 5.94
 5.28
 5.10
 4.42
 4.10

Glasgow

 9.18
 8.29
 7.27
 6.99
 4.80
 4.69
 3.46

Hackney

 10.26 
 8.97 
 7.28
 5.44
 4.88
 4.81
 4.65
 4.49
 4.36
 4.00

Halifax

 10.19 
 8.80 
 6.11
 6.09
 5.01
 4.56
 4.46
 4.24
 3.75

King's Lynn

 9.62
 9.22 
 (Kid Bodie) 8.11
 5.49
 5.15
 4.93
 4.38
 3.91
 3.79

Leicester

 10.94
 8.99
 8.78 
 5.47
 5.08
 4.88
 4.44
 3.33

Newport

 8.76 
 8.03
 7.87
 7.24
 4.84
 4.53
 4.42
 4.38
 2.11

Oxford

 7.60
 6.98
 6.86
 6.77
 6.70
 6.55
 4.58
 3.89
 2.57

Poole

 9.10
 7.76
 7.76
 6.03
 6.01
 4.93
 3.14

Reading

 10.05
 7.74 
 7.23
 6.74
 6.13 
 5.25
 4.75
 3.30

Sheffield

 10.74 
 7.58
 7.04
 6.60
 6.03 
 5.92
 5.11
 4.60

Swindon

 10.67
 9.76
 6.63
 4.98
 4.78
 3.80
 3.79
 3.43

Wembley

 9.04
 8.28
 7.80
 7.43
 5.72
 4.21
 1.33

West Ham

 8.73
 8.14
 6.51
 4.93
 4.44
 3.82
 3.66
 3.13
 2.98

Wimbledon

 9.89
 9.18
 6.25
 5.31
 5.13
 4.69
 4.19

Wolverhampton

 10.99
 7.61
 6.87
 6.56
 5.06
 .4.97
 4.80
 4.75
 3.43
 2.67

See also
List of United Kingdom Speedway League Champions
Knockout Cup (speedway)

References

British League
League
British League